Ion Gheorghe Duca (20 December 1879 – 29 December 1933) was Romanian politician and the Prime Minister of Romania from 14 November to 29 December 1933, when he was assassinated for his efforts to suppress the fascist Iron Guard movement.

Early life 
Duca was born in Bucharest on 20 December 1879. He was initiated into Freemasonry while he was studying in France. He completed his studies at the University of Paris, earning a doctorate in law in 1902. As part of a group of professors, physicians, soldiers and other professions, he helped bring scouting to Romania (see also Cercetașii României).

Political career
Duca entered Romania's Chamber of Deputies for the National Liberal Party in 1907. He served in the cabinet from 1914, and was appointed Minister of Foreign Affairs in 1922. He was an avid supporter of the Little Entente, formed between Romania, Yugoslavia, and Czechoslovakia to fend off Hungarian irredentist claims (Hungary claimed Transylvania and the Banat, which Romania gained after World War I) and prevent the House of Habsburg from returning to power in Central Europe.

In November 1933, King Carol II asked Duca to head the government as prime minister in preparation for the December elections.

In this capacity, Duca worked to keep in check the rising support for the Iron Guard, also known as Legion of the Archangel Michael, a fascist movement led by Corneliu Zelea Codreanu, even outlawing the Everything For the Country Party, its political arm. What followed was a time of violence when police on orders from Duca sometimes attacked Iron Guard members (which led to the deaths of 18 of the members), and jailed thousands of them. Shortly after, many of the Iron Guard members were released from jail.

Assassination

On 29 December 1933, just 45 days into his prime ministership, Duca was summoned to Peleș Castle, in Sinaia, for consultations with the king. On the return trip, at night, Duca was shot to death on the platform of the Sinaia train station. This was done in revenge for the actions taken by Duca against the Iron Guard, and because he had allowed for increased Jewish immigration while blocking that of Aromanians to Dobrudja. Duca's assassination was the first major political assassination in Romania since 1862.

Duca was assassinated by three Iron Guard members, that formed the Nicadori Iron Guard death squad, comprising Nicolae Constantinescu, Ion Caranica, and Doru Belimace. All three were arrested straight away and sentenced to hard labour for life. They were all killed, as were many other Iron Guard leaders, on 30 November 1938 while being transported to Jilava prison.

Legacy
Duca wrote extensive memoirs about his experiences as a cabinet minister during World War I. His son, George, edited Duca and George's memoirs while at the Hoover Institution at Stanford University in the 1970s and 1980s.

There are streets named after him in Bucharest, Constanța, Craiova, Eforie, Mediaș, and Otopeni, as well as a gymnasium in Petroșani.

References

External links
 Hoover article 1
 Hoover article 2
 

1879 births
1933 deaths
Anti-fascists
Politicians from Bucharest
National Liberal Party (Romania, 1875) politicians
Prime Ministers of Romania
Romanian Ministers of Agriculture
Romanian Ministers of Culture
Romanian Ministers of Education
Romanian Ministers of Foreign Affairs
Romanian Ministers of Interior
Members of the Chamber of Deputies (Romania)
Romanian memoirists
Romanian Freemasons
Scouting pioneers
Scouting and Guiding in Romania
People assassinated by the Romanian Iron Guard
Deaths by firearm in Romania
People murdered in Romania
Assassinated heads of government
University of Paris alumni
Romanian expatriates in France